Emmanuel Ibok Essien  was elected Senator for the Akwa-Ibom North West District of Akwa-Ibom State, Nigeria at the start of the Nigerian Fourth Republic, running on the People's Democratic Party (PDP) platform. He took office on 29 May 1999.

Essien studied Electrical/Electronics Engineering at the College of Technology, Calabar (1975 - 1977), the University of Ife (1977 - 1978) and Carleton University, Ottawa, Ontario, graduating in 1982 with a degree in Civil Engineering.
He worked with Mobil Producing Nigeria, taught at the Federal Polytechnic, Mubi, and established an engineering construction company, as well as undertaking large-scale farming.
In 2000, he established Ritman Nursery/Primary School and Ritman College and also Ritman University.

After taking his seat in the Senate in June 1999, Essien was appointed to committees on Works & Housing, Communication, National Planning, Internal Affairs, Information and Tourism & Culture (vice chairman).
He was Deputy Chief Whip of the Senate in 1999.
In September 2002, he was a strong supporter of a bill to end the onshore / offshore dichotomy in oil revenue allocation, a change that would benefit Akwa Ibom State.

Essien was an aspirant to be a candidate in the 2007 elections for Governor of Akwa Ibom State.
As of 2010, he was a member of the PDP Board of Trustees.

References

Living people
Peoples Democratic Party members of the Senate (Nigeria)
People from Akwa Ibom State
Obafemi Awolowo University alumni
Carleton University alumni
20th-century Nigerian politicians
21st-century Nigerian politicians
Year of birth missing (living people)